The Cape Town Progressive Jewish Congregation (CTPJC), also known as Temple Israel, is the umbrella body of three Progressive Jewish congregations in Cape Town (Wynberg, Green Point and Milnerton). As three congregations combined they are the largest Progressive congregation in South Africa and the second largest Jewish congregation in Cape Town. The congregation has over 3000 members and was first established in 1944. The CTPJC is an affiliate of the South African Union for Progressive Judaism (SAUPJ), which is part of the World Union for Progressive Judaism (WUPJ).

History
The congregation was founded in Green Point in 1944 by founding rabbinic couple, Rabbi Dr David Sherman (z”l) and Bertha Sherman. Green Point adjoins Sea Point the main centre of Jewish life in Cape Town. In 1965, a second temple was opened in Wynberg to serve congregants in the Southern Suburbs. The most recent congregation was formed in 1998 in Milnerton.

Leadership and organisation
The congregation is served by four rabbis;

Rabbi Greg Alexander was raised in Progressive Judaism in Johannesburg, and is a graduate of the University of Cape Town and Netzer Olami. He completed his rabbinical training at the Leo Baeck College in London.
Rabbi Malcolm Matitiani was raised in the Progressive movement in Pretoria. He became one of the first three rabbis to be ordained in Germany (at the Abraham-Geiger-Kolleg) since the Shoah. He also has a master's degree in Rabbinic Literature from the University of Cape Town.
Rabbi Emma Gottlieb is from Toronto, Canada. She graduated from the Hebrew Union College-Jewish Institute of Religion in New York City in 2010 and has subsequently served congregations in the United States and Canada.
Rabbi Richard Newman was raised in the Progressive movement in Cape Town. He lived in Israel for more than 16 years and completed his rabbinical training at Abraham-Geiger-Kolleg in Germany. He holds degrees from Leeds University and UNISA and has also lectured in Yiddish and Hebrew at the University of Denver.

References

External links
CTPJC official website

Progressive Judaism in South Africa
1944 establishments in South Africa
Jews and Judaism in South Africa
Jews and Judaism in Cape Town